Kolos is the name of several rural localities in Russia.

Modern localities
Kolos, Republic of Adygea, a khutor in Teuchezhsky District of the Republic of Adygea; 
Kolos, Novoalexandrovsky Selsoviet, Rubtsovsky District, Altai Krai, a crossing loop in Novoalexandrovsky Selsoviet of Rubtsovsky District in Altai Krai; 
Kolos, Rubtsovsky Selsoviet, Rubtsovsky District, Altai Krai, a settlement in Rubtsovsky Selsoviet of Rubtsovsky District in Altai Krai; 
Kolos, Bryansk Oblast, a settlement in Krasnorogsky Rural Administrative Okrug of Pochepsky District in Bryansk Oblast; 
Kolos, Kirov Oblast, a settlement in Adyshevsky Rural Okrug of Orichevsky District in Kirov Oblast
Kolos, Kostroma Oblast, a mestechko in Minskoye Settlement of Kostromskoy District in Kostroma Oblast
Kolos, Krasnodar Krai, a khutor in Oktyabrsky Rural Okrug of Krasnoarmeysky District in Krasnodar Krai
Kolos, Oryol Oblast, a settlement in Lunacharsky Selsoviet of Uritsky District in Oryol Oblast
Kolos, Penza Oblast, a settlement in Bessonovsky Selsoviet of Bessonovsky District in Penza Oblast
Kolos, Saratov Oblast, a settlement in Marksovsky District of Saratov Oblast
Kolos, Sverdlovsk Oblast, a settlement in Sysertsky District of Sverdlovsk Oblast
Kolos, Voronezh Oblast, a settlement in Kalacheyevskoye Rural Settlement of Kalacheyevsky District in Voronezh Oblast

Abolished localities
Kolos, Republic of Tatarstan, a village in Rybno-Slobodsky District of the Republic of Tatarstan; abolished in January 2009